John Alton Phillips (June 8, 1905 - June 12, 1965) was an American lawyer and Democratic politician. He was a member of the Mississippi House of Representatives from 1932 to 1940 and from 1944 until his death in 1965.

Biography 
John Alton Phillips was born on June 8, 1905, in Carrollton, Alabama. He moved to Brooksville, Mississippi, in 1918. He graduated from the University of Alabama and from Cumberland University, receiving his law degree at the latter. He first became a member of the Mississippi House of Representatives in 1932 and served until 1940. He was re-elected in 1944 and served continuously until his death at his home in Macon, Mississippi, on June 12, 1965.

References 

1905 births
1965 deaths
People from Macon, Mississippi
Democratic Party members of the Mississippi House of Representatives
Mississippi lawyers